Tati Solar Power Station (TSPS), is a planned  solar power station in Botswana. The power station is under development by a consortium that comprises two independent power producers (IPPs), one based in Botswana, and the other based in the United Kingdom. When completed, this renewable energy infrastructure project is expected to become the first privately owned, large-scale grid-ready, solar power plant in the country.

Location

Overview
The power station has a planned capacity of 100 megawatts. It will be developed in phases. The first phase will have capacity of 50 megawatts. As of February 2021, the developers had received an environmental certificate of compliance from the relevant local authorities. In July 2021, the Botswana Energy Regulatory Authority (BERA) also approved the project, and issued a generation license.

Developers
The power station is under development by a consortium comprising Shumba Energy Limited from Botswana and Solarcentury Africa, based in the United Kingdom.

Shumba Energy Limited
Shumba Energy Limited is a Botswana-based "mineral exploration company, with a portfolio of exploration and mining coal projects". Its stock of shares is listed on the Botswana Stock Exchange and co-listed on the Mauritius Stock Exchange.

Solarcentury Africa
Solarcentury Africa is a subsidiary of BB Energy, an independent energy trading company, based in the United Kingdom. It primarily deals in "gasoil, gasoline, bitumen and fuel oil". As of August 2021, Solarcentury maintains a portfolio of 2.1 gigawatts of installed generation capacity, sold to mining operations, commercial and industrial clients in Africa.

The owner/developers of this power station are expected to create a special purpose vehicle company to own and operate the solar farm. For descriptive purposes, we shall call that SPV Tati Solar Company. The table below illustrates the shareholding in Tati Solar Company.

See also

 List of power stations in Botswana
 Phakalane Power Station

References

External links
 Website of Shumba Energy Limited
 Website of Solarcentury Africa
 Shumba Energy to Develop $80 Million Solar Project in Botswana As of 16 November 2021.

Solar power stations in Botswana
Photovoltaic power stations in Botswana
Francistown